Rat Trap is a Big Finish Productions audio drama based on the long-running British science fiction television series Doctor Who.

Plot
In 1983 the TARDIS arrives in an underground complex, formerly the site of a notorious experimental laboratory, now the kingdom of the Rat King.

Cast
The Doctor – Peter Davison
Tegan Jovanka – Janet Fielding
Nyssa – Sarah Sutton
Vislor Turlough – Mark Strickson
Clifford Andrews – John Banks
Sally Lucas – Alison Thea-Skot
Dr. Wallace / The Rat King – Terry Molloy
Kevin – David Seymour
Matthew/Major Harris – Andrew Dickens
Caitlin Jones – Charlie Norfolk

Notes
Terry Molloy played Davros in the 1980s serials Resurrection of the Daleks, Revelation of the Daleks and Remembrance of the Daleks as well as in many Big Finish audios.
Tony Lee is the writer of the monthly Doctor Who comic books for IDW Publishing, featuring the Tenth and Eleventh Doctors.  This is his first story for Big Finish Productions.

External links
Rat Trap

2011 audio plays
Fifth Doctor audio plays
Fiction set in 1983